"Roundball Rock"  is a musical score composed by John Tesh and used for The NBA on NBC from 1990 until 2002. NBC played the theme 12,000 times during their run. Tesh came up with the melody while at a hotel and called his answering machine at home to sing a preliminary version of the melody so he would not forget it. A more rock-oriented variant was introduced in 1997 to coincide with the debut of the WNBA. That theme was also used until 2002, and on NBC's WNBA telecasts only. Since 2018, it has been used as the theme song for CBB on FOX.

Appearances after 2002
When ABC took over broadcasting rights for the National Basketball Association (NBA) from NBC, Tesh offered them the rights to also use his theme, but they declined and chose to compose their own theme music instead. The theme is still memorable three decades later, especially because of its association with the NBA's ascendance in the 1990s. Tesh released a free MP3 version on his website to commemorate the 2008 NBA Finals.

The tune was revived for NBC's coverage of basketball at the Summer Olympics in 2008, 2016, and 2020 as it was used in commercial bumpers and starting lineup announcements.

The theme was sampled by Nelly for his song "Heart of a Champion" from his studio album, Sweat, and compilation album Sweatsuit. "Roundball Rock" was also used in The Boondocks episode "Ballin'".

On April 13, 2013, Saturday Night Live parodied John Tesh pitching the theme to NBC Sports executives. In this sketch, the tune featured comical lyrics sung by John's fictional brother Dave.

A re-recording of the tune is used by Tesh as theme music for his syndicated radio show, as well as for the television series Intelligence for Your Life that Tesh co-hosts with his wife Connie Sellecca.

On September 17, 2017, NBC briefly played the tune heading into a commercial break during a Sunday Night Football game, over a replay of a jump shot-themed touchdown celebration by Atlanta Falcons players Devonta Freeman and Andy Levitre.

On September 11, 2020, TNT played "Heart of a Champion" going into a commercial break, during Game 7 of an Eastern Conference Semifinals series between the Toronto Raptors and Boston Celtics.

On April 6, 2022, to commemorate the 75th anniversary of the NBA, ESPN2 broadcast the Brooklyn Nets and New York Knicks game in a throwback-style telecast dubbed the "RetroCast", in which each quarter was shown in a different style of visuals and sounds from decades past beginning with the 1960s. The tune played in the fourth quarter, which focused on the 1990s, during commercial breaks and timeouts.

In December 2022 the song was used for promotion for All Elite Wrestling (AEW)'s Winter Is Coming television special after AEW secured the rights to the song. AEW president Tony Khan was reported to be a major fan of the theme. The song was later used in the January 3rd, 2023 edition of AEW Dynamite to promote match 7 of a best-of-7 series between The Elite and Death Triangle for the AEW World Trios Championship.

Usage by Fox Sports
Fox Sports announced in December 2018 that it had acquired the rights to "Roundball Rock", which it will play for CBB on FOX. CBB on FS1 had used their old theme (a "marching band" variant of the NFL on FOX theme), the same one as CFB on FOX/FS1, but switched to this theme for the 2019-20 college basketball season.

See also
National Basketball Association music

References

Further reading

External links
Roundball Rock on teshmedia.com

Sports television theme songs
Basketball on NBC
1990 songs